Alex Gibson may refer to:

Alex Gibson (footballer, born 1925) (1925–1993), Scottish footballer
Alex Gibson (footballer, born 1939) (1939–2003), Scottish footballer
Alex Gibson (footballer, born 1982), English footballer
Alex Gibson (music producer) (born 1974), American record producer
Alex Gibson (sound editor), British music and sound editor, known for his work on films
Soulman Alex G, real name Alex Gibson, professional wrestler

See also 
Alexander Gibson (disambiguation)